Kenar Sar (also Romanized as Kenār Sar; also known as Kenārehsar, Kenar Sare Kooch Esfahan, Kenār Sīr, Kinārehsar, and Kinerser) is a village in Kenar Sar Rural District, Kuchesfahan District, Rasht County, Gilan Province, Iran. At the 2006 census, its population was 1,578, in 469 families.

References 

Populated places in Rasht County